Transfer of Power is Vince Flynn's fourth published book in 1999 and is third book featuring Mitch Rapp, the CIA's super agent. The book was released on July 1, 1999 by Pocket Books. It reached number 13 in the New York Times paperback bestsellers chart.

Plot summary 

Rapp is introduced while he is performing a covert operation in Iran and he discovers a possible terrorist attack planned for the nation's capital to happen in the near future. Meanwhile, in Washington, D.C., Anna Reilly is starting her first day as a White House correspondent for NBC. It also happens to be the day where the terrorist, using a secret entrance, takes over the White House and holds it hostage.  The president, who barely escaped the hostage situation, remains trapped in the unfinished bomb shelter. With the vice president using this opportunity as commander in chief to glorify his political career by being lenient towards the terrorist demands, Rapp must find a way to fight the terrorists from the inside of the White House. It is here where he saves Anna Reilly from being raped by one of the terrorists. 

Several Navy SEALs sneak into the White House, eliminate the terrorists, and save the hostages and the president. The leader of the terrorist group manages to escape the White House while detonating his strategically placed explosives. He is later found in South America only to be killed by Rapp.

Critical reaction
The Houston Chronicle said "Flynn keeps the action moving". Brandywine Books found it entertaining but lacking as great literature ("In terms of storytelling, his performance is flawless... As a piece of prose writing, the book is less successful.").  Publishers Weekly praised Flynn for its "spicy broth of brutal terrorists, heroic commandos and ... secret agent hijinks".

References

Novels by Vince Flynn
Books about terrorism
Pocket Books books

See also
Peaceful transfer of power